Union Institute & University (UI&U) is a private university in Cincinnati, Ohio. It specializes in limited residence and distance learning programs. The university is accredited by the Higher Learning Commission and operates satellite campuses in Florida and California.

History
Union Institute & University traces its origins to 1964, when the president of Goddard College hosted the presidents of nine liberal arts institutions at a conference to discuss cooperation in educational innovation and experimentation. The Union for Research and Experimentation in Higher Education was established with Antioch College, Bard College, Goddard College, Chicago Teachers North, Monteith Masson, New College at Hofstra University, Sarah Lawrence College, Shimer College, and Stephens College originally forming The Union for Research and Experimentation in Higher Education, later known as the Union Institute. The "discovery" of the English open education movement may have played a factor in the interest in progressive education.

From its inception, the institution had a continuing emphasis on social relevance and interdisciplinarity of research. The Union Graduate School's doctoral programs were based on the British tutorial system. The first doctoral students were admitted in 1970. Samuel Baskin, a psychologist and educational reformer who served on the faculty of Stephens and Antioch colleges, was the founding president of the Union for Experimenting Colleges and Universities, Union Graduate School, and the University Without Walls. Margaret Mead, an anthropologist and author, was one of the institution's first professors.

Renamed in 1969 as the Union for Experimenting Colleges and Universities, it focused on providing educational opportunities for non-traditional students whose needs were best served by a low-residency college experience, as well as those students who sought to conduct socially relevant research in an interdisciplinary manner. The institution is based on the Oxbridge educational model. By 1971, five more colleges and universities joined the Union, bringing the total consortium to 22 schools of higher education. In 1975, the number of schools in the University Without Walls network reached 34. The Union provided administrative support for these programs under the guidance of Samuel Baskin.

The Union of Experimenting Colleges and Universities, or UECU, disbanded in 1982, but the University Without Walls remained in operation.

Acquisition of Vermont College and name changes
The University Without Walls was renamed in 1989 as "The Union Institute". The Union Institute acquired Vermont College in Montpelier, Vermont, from Norwich University in 2001. The purchase of Vermont College added several master's degree programs and an adult degree program to the Union's existing undergraduate and doctoral programs. This enabled The Union to provide a progression of degree opportunities, along with certificates in advanced graduate study. In October 2001, the Union Institute was renamed "Union Institute & University".

Academics
Union Institute & University offers BA, BS, MA, MS, MBA, Ed.D., Ph.D. and certificate programs in a variety of fields and disciplines.

Union Institute & University's PhD program came under scrutiny by the Ohio Board of Regents, culminating in a reauthorization report published in 2002. In response to the report, Union underwent major academic and structural changes, including dissolution of the Union Graduate School and restructuring of its PhD programs. The PhD in Arts and Sciences, for example, was redesigned to a PhD in Interdisciplinary Studies, with four majors: Ethical and Creative Leadership, Public Policy and Social Change, Humanities and Culture, and Educational Studies, and offers a specialization in Dr. Martin Luther King Jr. Studies. In 2004 the U.S. Department of Education also raised concerns about the quality of the institute's PhD programs.

Notable alumni

 Tania Aebi, the youngest circumnavigator of the globe by sail (age 18–21); author, Maiden Voyage.
 Stanley Aronowitz, trade-unionist, social critic, and scholar.
 Brother Blue, street performance artist, and instructor.
 Rita Mae Brown, poet and author of Rubyfruit Jungle.
 Joseph Bruchac, Native writer, educator, and storyteller; Lifetime Achievement Award from the Native Writers' Circle of the Americas.
 Danny K. Davis, congressman, Illinois 7th District.
 Gary Dorrien, Reinhold Niebuhr Professor of Social Ethics, Union Theological Seminary, NY.
 Lez Edmond, civil rights activist, author, and professor at St. John's University.
 Clarissa Pinkola Estés, Jungian analyst and author of Women Who Run With The Wolves.
 Sidney Harman, founder, harman/kardon, Inc. and publisher of Newsweek magazine.
 Gerald Haslam, author, Workin' Man Blues, Straight White Male, Coming of Age in California.
 Carl Hausman, professor of journalism at Rowan University and author of Lies We Live By: Defeating Double-talk and Deception in Advertising, Politics and the Media (Routledge, 2000) and other works.
 Jean Houston, author and lecturer, co-founder of the Foundation for Mind Research.
 Michael T. Klare, professor of Peace and World Security Studies, Hampshire College.
 Bernie Krause, bioacoustics authority.
 Elizabeth Kapuʻuwailani Lindsey, actor, filmmaker, and anthropologist.
 Aurora Levins Morales, Puerto Rican writer and poet.
 Phillip Lopate, film critic, essayist, fiction writer, and poet.
 James P. Lyke, Roman Catholic prelate; auxiliary bishop of Cleveland (1978-1990) and archbishop of Atlanta (1991–92)
Karyl McBride, psychotherapist and author
 Portia Simpson-Miller, first female Prime Minister of Jamaica, 2006–2007, 2012–2016.
 Scott Douglas Miller, President of Virginia Wesleyan University, former president of Bethany College, Wesley College, and Lincoln Memorial University
 Gary Null, radio personality, alternative medicine practitioner, nutritionist, and HIV-AIDS denialist.
 Antonia Pantoja, educator, social worker, civil rights leader, and founder of ASPIRA, Boricua College, and Producer.
 Lincoln Ragsdale, member of the Tuskegee Airmen and real estate developer.
 Jane O'Meara Driscoll Sanders, social worker and academic administrator, provost and Interim President of Goddard College, 1996–1997, president of Burlington College, 2004–2011.
 Clayton Valli, poet and linguist.

References

External links
 

 
1964 establishments in Ohio
Educational institutions established in 1964
Greater Cincinnati Consortium of Colleges and Universities
Private universities and colleges in Ohio